Romain Brégerie (born 9 August 1986) is a French footballer who plays as a centre-back.

Career
After moving from FC Girondins de Bordeaux in summer 2008 to FC Metz, the defender was loaned to LB Châteauroux in January 2010. In June 2011 he signed a two-year contract with Dynamo Dresden. On 4 July 2014, he signed a one-year contract with SV Darmstadt 98. In January 2018, he returned to Darmstadt, joining on loan from Ingolstadt 04 for the second half of the season.

References

External links
 
 
 
 

1986 births
Living people
People from Talence
Association football defenders
French footballers
French expatriate footballers
France under-21 international footballers
FC Girondins de Bordeaux players
FC Sète 34 players
FC Metz players
LB Châteauroux players
Dynamo Dresden players
SV Darmstadt 98 players
FC Ingolstadt 04 players
Ligue 1 players
Ligue 2 players
Bundesliga players
2. Bundesliga players
Expatriate footballers in Germany
Sportspeople from Gironde
Footballers from Nouvelle-Aquitaine